Julian L. Lapides (September 17, 1931 – July 14, 2021) was an American politician who served in the Maryland House of Delegates from 1963 to 1967 and in the Maryland Senate from 1967 to 1995. Known to his friends and colleagues as "Jack", Lapides was often called the conscience of the Maryland State Senate. He later served as a member of the Maryland State Ethics Commission.

Early life and education
Born in Baltimore, Maryland, on September 17, 1931, Lapides attended Baltimore public schools and graduated from the Baltimore City College high school in 1949. He attended Johns Hopkins University and then Towson State College (now Towson University) where he earned his B.S. degree in 1954. After two years in the United States Army, Lapides was accepted at the University of Maryland Francis King Carey School of Law, where he earned his LL.B., in 1961. Lapides was admitted to the Maryland Bar in 1965.

Career

Lapides was elected to the Maryland House of Delegates in 1962, in 1966 he won his seat in the Maryland Senate, where he served until 1994 when redistricting caused him to lose the district he had served for 28 years. While in the Senate, he chaired the Joint Budget and Audit Committee and the Joint Committee on Legislative Ethics. He was a member of the Budget and Taxation Committee and the Public Safety, Transportation, Economic Development & Natural Resources Subcommittees. Lapides was also a member of the Capital Budget Subcommittee, Pensions Subcommittee, the Legislative Policy Committee, and several other subcommittees and task forces.

Lapides was a contributor to and a member of the Maryland State Arts Council, past president of Baltimore Heritage, the American Antiquarian Society, the Peale Museum, the Baltimore Museum of Art, the Walters Art Museum and Victorian Society in America. He was a life member of the NAACP, past President of the Maryland Kidney Foundation, Regional vice-president of the National Kidney Foundation (1970–72).

He died of cancer on July 14, 2021, in Baltimore, Maryland, at age 89.

References

1931 births
2021 deaths
20th-century American politicians
Baltimore City College alumni
Deaths from cancer in Maryland
Democratic Party Maryland state senators
Democratic Party members of the Maryland House of Delegates
Towson University alumni
Politicians from Baltimore
Military personnel from Baltimore